The gray kingbird or grey kingbird (Tyrannus dominicensis), also known as pitirre, petchary or white-breasted kingbird, is a passerine bird. The species was first described on the island of Hispaniola, then called Santo Domingo, thus the dominicensis name.

Habitat
This tyrant flycatcher is found in tall trees and shrubs, including the edges of savanna and marshes. It makes a flimsy cup nest in a tree. The female incubates the typical clutch of two cream eggs, which are marked with reddish brown.

Description
The adult gray kingbird is an average-sized kingbird. The upperparts are gray, with brownish wings and tail, and the underparts are white with a gray tinge to the chest. The head has a concealed yellow crown stripe, and a dusky mask through the eyes. The dark bill is heavier than that of the related, slightly smaller, tropical kingbird. The sexes are similar, but young birds have rufous edges on the wing coverts, rump and tail.

Call
The call is a loud rolling trill, pipiri, pipiri, which is the reason behind many of its local onomatopoeiac names, like pestigre or pitirre, in the Spanish-speaking Greater Antilles, or petchary in some of the English-speaking islands.

Diet and behaviour
Gray kingbirds wait on an exposed perch high in a tree, occasionally sallying out to feed on insects (such as bees, dragonflies, wasps and beetles), their staple diet. They also eat small fruits and berries depending on its availability. Fruits and berries make up one fifth of their daily diet. Spiders and small lizards are occasionally eaten.

Like other kingbirds, these birds aggressively defend their territory against intruders, including mammals and much larger birds such as crested caracaras, red-tailed hawks and broad-winged hawks by mobbing.

Distribution
It is found in increasing numbers in the state of Florida, and is more often found inland though it had been previously restricted to the coast. It breeds from the extreme southeast of the United States, mainly in Florida, as well as Central America, and through the West Indies south to Venezuela, Trinidad and Tobago, the Guianas, and Colombia. Northern populations are migratory, wintering on the Caribbean coast of Central America and northern South America. Several vagrant populations are known to exist in the Northeastern United States.

Gallery

References

External links

 Videos, photos & sounds on the Internet Bird Collection
 Bird sounds - Florida Museum of Natural History

gray kingbird
Native birds of the Southeastern United States
Birds of the Caribbean
Birds of the Dominican Republic
Birds of Venezuela
gray kingbird
gray kingbird